The 1946–47 Chicago Stags season was the first season of the now defunct Chicago Stags of the Basketball Association of America (BAA/NBA).

Roster

Regular season

Season standings

Record vs. opponents

Game log

1947 BAA playoffs

BAA Semifinals
(E1) Washington Capitols vs. (W1) Chicago Stags: Stags win series 4-2
Game 1 @ Washington (April 2): Chicago 81, Washington 65
Game 2 @ Washington (April 3): Chicago 69, Washington 53
Game 3 @ Chicago (April 8): Chicago 67, Washington 55
Game 4 @ Washington (April 10): Washington 76, Chicago 69
Game 5 @ Chicago (April 12): Washington 67, Chicago 55
Game 6 @ Chicago (April 13): Chicago 66, Washington 61

BAA Finals
Philadelphia Warriors vs. Chicago Stags: Warriors win series 4-1
Game 1 @ Philadelphia (April 16): Philadelphia 84, Chicago 71
Game 2 @ Philadelphia (April 17): Philadelphia 85, Chicago 74
Game 3 @ Chicago (April 19): Philadelphia 75, Chicago 72
Game 4 @ Chicago (April 20): Chicago 74, Philadelphia 73
Game 5 @ Philadelphia (April 22): Philadelphia 83, Chicago 80

References

Chicago Stags seasons
Chicago Stags